Hepler, Kansas is a city in Crawford County, Kansas, United States.

Hepler may also refer to:

 James Hepler
 Bill Hepler
 Ann-Marie Hepler
 Jesse Hepler Lilac Arboretum

See also